Mane Bajić (Serbian Cyrillic: Манојло Мане Бајић; 7 December 1941 – 6 March 1994) was a Serbian football player that played as midfielder.

Sports career
Bajić experienced his football affirmation in Partizan, where he played from 1962 to 1970. During this period, he played a total of 451 games, 208 of which were championship games, and he scored 102 goals, of which 34 were championship goals.

With Partizan, he won two Yugoslav championship titles in seasons 1962–63 and 1964–65. With the Partizan team, he achieved his greatest success, playing in the European Cup final in 1965–66 against Real Madrid.

After Partizan, in 1970, Bajić found employment abroad, he signed for French Lille. He spends two seasons in Olympique and during that time, he plays 38 league games for Lille and scores 4 goals. after Lille he ends his active playing career.

Death
He died in a traffic collision on 6 March 1994 in front of the Yugoslav Parliament building.

References

External links
 Mane Bajić at Reprezentacija.rs 

1941 births
1994 deaths
Footballers from Belgrade
Yugoslav footballers
Serbian footballers
Yugoslavia international footballers
Association football midfielders
Yugoslav First League players
FK Partizan players
Ligue 1 players
Lille OSC players
Yugoslav expatriate footballers
Serbian expatriate footballers
Expatriate footballers in France
Road incident deaths in Yugoslavia
Road incident deaths in Serbia
Yugoslav expatriate sportspeople in France